Hypselodoris nigrolineata is a species of colourful sea slug or dorid nudibranch, a marine gastropod mollusk in the family Chromodorididae.

Distribution
This nudibranch is found in the Indian Ocean off Kenya and Tanzania.

Description
Hypselodoris nigrolineata has a white-cream body and a bright purple mantle edge and foot. There are often black striated lines running longitudinally along its dorsum. The gills and rhinophores are orange. This species can reach a total length of at least 35 mm. It is similar in appearance to Hypselodoris maritima.

References

Chromodorididae
Gastropods described in 1904